In April 1947, the Dr. Behçet Uz Hospital was built after a fire burned Izmir when the Turkish military troops visited. The building is the built in the 'Modernist style' of architecture as it was part of the city planning and architecture project in the 1920s. It was designed and built by Zeki Sayar and continues to function as a children's hospital. The structure is well-preserved and has not changed significantly since its creation. Hikmet Gökmen restored the building and reorganized and updated the surrounding environment to fit modern needs.

Location 
The building is located on Cumhuriyet square with a planted garden by the partition border walls. Due to the destruction of World War I, Izmir lost many architectural buildings. And while the city was rebuilt many public and governmental structures were built around the hospital. The area around the hospital was built with wide boulevards.

Architecture 

The hospital is built out of 4 story blocks which join together in a rectangular leaving an atrium in the center. The 19th-century architectural approach aimed to utilize sunlight. The same rectangular geometric form repeats itself in openings on the exterior facade following modern aspects in architecture. Up until the 1920s Turkish architecture used traditional features as a way of being more nationalist, but transitioned to more modern architectural styles in the 30s. This hospital and the Gazi Primary School are good examples of the modern architectural style.

Another difference from other hospitals is a rectangular oriented block and their corridors have rooms both sides. İt is also possible to observe these types of corridors in Gazi School in Alsancak. The school was also part of that modern aspect of architecture.

The hospital is an example of the use of supporting walls in construction. As a result of the supporting walls, it has large regular rectangular windows that allow for much natural light and need little artificial lighting. However, the corridors still need artificial lighting.

The roof structure is red tile patterned with an angle and similar characteristics to the surrounding public buildings to catch the harmony of them. The building is painted pink. The color decision is more relevant to the function of the structure instead of the design or composition.

External links

References

1947 establishments in Turkey
Hospitals in İzmir Province
Children's hospitals
Konak District
Hospitals established in 1947